Andrew E. Dinniman (born 1944) is an American politician who served as a Democratic member of the Pennsylvania State Senate for the 19th District from June 2006 until 2020.

Early life and education
Dinniman was born in New Haven, Connecticut.  He received his BA from the University of Connecticut in 1966, and his MA from the University of Maryland in 1969. He also holds an Ed.D from Pennsylvania State University.

Teaching career
Dinniman Taught at Prince George Community College and West Chester University.

Early political career
Dinniman's first elected position was as a member of Downingtown school district's board of school directors. He was first elected to this position in 1975, and held the post until 1979. In 1979, Dinniman was elected chairman of the Chester County Democratic Committee, a position he held until 1985.

County Commissioner
Dinniman later served as Chester County commissioner for three terms, beginning in 1991. During his three terms as commissioner, Dinniman was the body's only Democrat.

Pennsylvania State Senate

2006 special election
After the death of Republican Senator Robert "Bob" Thompson in 2006, Dinniman sought and attained his party's nomination to run in the ensuing special election. The special election pit Dinniman against his fellow county commissioner, Republican Carol Aichele. In what was considered a political surprise, Dinniman won with 56% of the vote, becoming the first Democrat elected to represent Chester County in the state Senate since the 1920s.

2008 election
Dinniman faced re-election in 2008. He handily defeated Republican Steve Kantrowitz, a retired U.S. Navy Admiral, with 57.8% of the vote.

2012 election
Dinniman faced re-election in 2012. He handily defeated Chris Amentas, an East Fallowfield Township supervisor, with 57.45% of the vote.

2016 election
Dinniman faced re-election again in 2016 against Republican Jack London. He handily won with 56.33% of the vote.

Committee assignments
At the time of his retirement, Dinniman sat on five committees: Education; Communications and Technology; Agriculture and Rural Affairs; Environmental Resources and Energy; and State Government. He was the ranking Democrat on the Senate's education committee.

Retirement
After initially preparing for a re-election campaign, Dinniman announced he would not seek another term and retire at the end of 2020. He was succeeded by Carolyn Comitta.

Potential congressional candidacy
In 2009, the non-partisan political newspaper The Hill reported that Dinniman was "reportedly eyeing a run" for the Democratic nomination in the congressional seat being vacated by Republican Jim Gerlach, who was, at the time, running for governor. Dinniman, however, ultimately did not enter the race. He endorsed Manan Trivedi, a doctor from Reading, who went on to win the Democratic primary, but lost the fall general election to Gerlach.

References

External links
State Senator Andy Dinniman official caucus website
Senator Andrew E. Dinniman (D) official PA Senate website
Andy Dinniman for PA Senate official campaign website

Follow the Money - Andy Dinniman
2006, 2008 campaign contributions

|-

1944 births
20th-century American politicians
21st-century American politicians
Living people
Democratic Party Pennsylvania state senators
Penn State College of Education alumni
People from Chester County, Pennsylvania
Politicians from New Haven, Connecticut
University of Connecticut alumni
University of Maryland, College Park alumni
West Chester University faculty
Chester County Commissioners (Pennsylvania)
School board members in Pennsylvania